Francis Richard Handley (31 October 1910 – 31 October 1985) was an English athlete who competed for Great Britain in the 1936 Summer Olympics.

He was born and died in Salford.

In 1936 he was eliminated in the semi-finals of the 800 metres event.

At the 1938 Empire Games he won the silver medal in the 880 yards competition. He was also a member of the English relay team which won the silver medal in the 4×440 yards contest. In the 440 yards event he was eliminated in the heats.

External links

1910 births
1985 deaths
English male sprinters
English male middle-distance runners
Olympic athletes of Great Britain
Athletes (track and field) at the 1936 Summer Olympics
Athletes (track and field) at the 1938 British Empire Games
Commonwealth Games silver medallists for England
Commonwealth Games medallists in athletics
20th-century English people
Medallists at the 1938 British Empire Games